The Myxotrichaceae  are a family of fungi in the Ascomycetes class, and has seven genera. Fungi in this family are mostly found in soil. Indoors, they can be found in paper substrates, damp drywall, and decomposing materials. They produce black, mesh-like, setose ascocarps with small, fusiform ascospores. Myxotrichum deflexum produces a pinkish-red diffusing pigment and may produce grey, black, and brown stains on paper surfaces. No reports of mycotoxins, pathogenicity, or allergy are known.

References

Onygenales
Ascomycota families